Neurolenin B is an antimalarial chemical isolated from Eupatorium inulaefolium.

External links
 Antimalarial activity of neurolenin B and derivates of Eupatorium inulaefolium (Asteraceae)

Antimalarial agents
Eupatorieae
Oxygen heterocycles
Lactones
Acetate esters
Heterocyclic compounds with 2 rings
Isovalerate esters
Tertiary alcohols
Ketones